Francis John "Frank" Surman ( – 3 June 1925) was a New Zealand rugby union player and professional athlete. He represented the New Zealand national rugby team in 1896. A utility back, he played at any position in the backline from halfback to the three-quarter line.

Early life
Surman is listed in some publications as having been born and raised in Thames but this is far from certain.

Rugby union
Surman holds the distinction of being one of the first players to play top-level rugby in both New Zealand and Australia.

In 1893 Surman played for New South Wales against the touring New Zealand side. The next season, he was one of six New Zealand-born players in the New South Wales side that toured New Zealand. He played in 10 of the 12 matches on that tour, four of which were at halfback, five on the wing and one at centre. In his 16 matches for New South Wales Surman scored four tries.

His sole appearance for the New Zealand national team was at centre against Queensland at Athletic Park in 1896. Unfortunately he was injured and left the field in the second half of that game when he tripped over the wire keeping spectators out of the field of play.

Surman returned to Sydney and played for Randwick in 1898 and 1899. In 1900 he played on the wing for Eastern Suburbs in Sydney. In 1908 Surman was reported to have joined the St George rugby club in Sydney.

Athletics
Surman ran as a professional athlete in Australia. His most notable victory was the 30th Botany Grand Handicap in Sydney in 1892, in which he won a purse of £100.

Later life
Surman married Emma Jane Edmonson (née Atkins), a widow, in Sydney in 1908. He worked as a master butcher in the Sydney suburb of Rockdale.

Surman died aged 59 at his home in Rockdale on 3 June 1925, and was buried at Woronora Cemetery.

References 

1860s births
1925 deaths
New Zealand international rugby union players
New Zealand rugby union players
Canterbury rugby union players
Auckland rugby union players
Rugby union scrum-halves
Rugby union fly-halves
Rugby union centres
Rugby union wings
Australian rugby union players
New South Wales Waratahs players
New Zealand male sprinters
Australian male sprinters
Rugby union players from Sydney